Yttrium phosphide is an inorganic compound of yttrium and phosphorus with the chemical formula YP. The compound may be also classified as yttrium(III) phosphide.

Synthesis
Heating (500–1000 °C) of pure substances in a vacuum:

4Y + P4 -> 4YP

Properties
Yttrium phosphide forms cubic crystals.

Uses
Ytttium phosphide is a semiconductor used in laser diodes, and in high power and frequency applications.

References

Phosphides
Yttrium compounds
Rock salt crystal structure